The Kurdish–Turkish conflict is an armed conflict between the Republic of Turkey and various Kurdish insurgent groups who have either demanded separation from Turkey to create an independent Kurdistan, or attempted to secure autonomy and greater political and cultural rights for Kurds inside the Republic of Turkey.

The main rebel group is the Kurdistan Workers' Party (PKK) (Kurdish: Partiya Karkerên Kurdistanê). Although the Kurdish-Turkish conflict has spread to many regions, most of the conflict has taken place in Northern Kurdistan, which corresponds with southeastern Turkey. The PKK's presence in Iraqi Kurdistan has resulted in the Turkish Armed Forces carrying out frequent ground incursions and air and artillery strikes in the region, and its influence in Syrian Kurdistan has led to similar activity there. The conflict has cost the economy of Turkey an estimated $300 to 450 billion, mostly in military costs. It has also affected tourism in Turkey.

A revolutionary group, the PKK was founded in 1978 in the village of Fis, Lice by a group of Kurdish students led by Abdullah Öcalan. The initial reason given by the PKK for this was the oppression of Kurds in Turkey. At the time, the use of Kurdish language, dress, folklore, and names were banned in Kurdish-inhabited areas. In an attempt to deny their existence, the Turkish government categorized Kurds as "Mountain Turks" during the 1930s and 1940s. The words "Kurds", "Kurdistan", or "Kurdish" were officially banned by the Turkish government. Following the military coup of 1980, the Kurdish language was officially prohibited in public and private life until 1991. Many who spoke, published, or sang in Kurdish were arrested and imprisoned.

The PKK was formed in an effort to establish linguistic, cultural, and political rights for Turkey's Kurdish minority. However, the full-scale insurgency did not begin until 15 August 1984, when the PKK announced a Kurdish uprising. Since the conflict began, more than 40,000 have died, the vast majority of whom were Kurdish civilians. Both sides were accused of numerous human rights abuses during the conflict. The European Court of Human Rights has condemned Turkey for thousands of human rights abuses. Many judgments are related to the systematic executions of Kurdish civilians, torture, forced displacements, destroyed villages, arbitrary arrests, and the forced disappearance or murder of Kurdish journalists, activists and politicians. Teachers who provided and students who demanded education in Kurdish language were prosecuted and sentenced for supporting terrorism of the PKK. On the other hand, the PKK has faced international condemnation, mainly by Turkish allies, for using terrorist tactics, which include civilian massacres, summary executions, suicide bombers, and child soldiers, and involvement in drug trafficking. The organization is historically to blame for the burning of schools and killing of teachers who they accused of "destroying Kurdish identity", attacks on hospitals which resulted in the death of doctors and nurses, and allegedly the kidnapping of foreign tourists for ransom.

In February 1999, PKK leader Abdullah Öcalan was arrested in Nairobi, Kenya by a group of special forces personnel and taken to Turkey, where he remains in prison on an island in the Sea of Marmara. The first insurgency lasted until March 1993, when the PKK declared an unilateral ceasefire. Fighting resumed the same year. In 2013, the Turkish government started talks with Öcalan. Following mainly secret negotiations, a largely successful ceasefire was put in place by both the Turkish state and the PKK. On 21 March 2013, Öcalan announced the "end of armed struggle" and a ceasefire with peace talks.

On 25 July 2015, the conflict resumed when the Turkish Air Force bombed PKK positions in Iraq, in the midst of tensions arising from Turkish involvement in the Rojava–Islamist conflict in Syria. With the resumption of violence, hundreds of Kurdish civilians have been killed by both sides and numerous human rights violations have occurred, including torture, rape, and widespread destruction of property. Substantial parts of many Kurdish-majority cities including Diyarbakır, Şırnak, Mardin, Cizre, Nusaybin, and Yüksekova were destroyed in the clashes.

History

Beginnings
In 1977, a small group under Öcalan's leadership released a declaration on Kurdish identity in Turkey. The group, which called itself the Revolutionaries of Kurdistan also included Ali Haydar Kaytan, Cemil Bayik, Haki Karer and Kemal Pir. The group decided in 1974 to start a campaign for Kurdish rights. Cemil Bayik was sent to Urfa, Kemal Pir to Mus, Haki Karer to Batman, and Ali Haydar Kaytan to Tunceli. They then started student organisations that contacted local workers and farmers to raise awareness about Kurdish rights.

In 1977, an assembly was held to evaluate these political activities. The assembly included 100 people from different backgrounds and several representatives of other leftist organisations. In spring 1977, Öcalan travelled to Mount Ararat, Erzurum, Tunceli, Elazig, Antep, and other cities to make the public aware of the group's activities. This was followed by a Turkish government crackdown against the organisation. On 18 March 1977, Haki Karer was assassinated in Antep. During this period, the group was also targeted by the Turkish ultranationalist organization, the Nationalist Movement Party's Grey Wolves. Some wealthy Kurdish landowners targeted the group as well, killing Halil Çavgun on 18 May 1978, which resulted in large protest meetings in Erzurum, Dersim, Elazig, and Antep.

The founding Congress of the PKK was held on 27 November 1978 in Fis, a village near the city of Lice. During this congress, the 25 people present decided to found the Kurdistan Workers' Party. The Turkish state, Turkish rightist groups, and some Kurdish landowners continued their attacks on the group. In response, the PKK organised and armed members to protect itself, thus becoming more involved in the fighting between leftist and rightist groups in Turkey (1978–1980). During this time, the right-wing Grey Wolves militia killed 109 and injured 176 Alevi Kurds in the town of Kahramanmaraş on 25 December 1978 in what would become known as the Maraş Massacre. In Summer 1979, Öcalan travelled to Syria and Lebanon where he made contacts with Syrian and Palestinian leaders. After the Turkish coup d'état on 12 September 1980 and a crackdown which was launched on all political organisations, during which at least 191 people were killed and half a million were imprisoned, most of the PKK withdrew into Syria and Lebanon. Öcalan went to Syria in September 1980 with Kemal Pir, Mahsum Korkmaz, and Delil Dogan being sent to set up an organisation in Lebanon. Some PKK fighters took part in the 1982 Lebanon War on the Syrian side.

The Second PKK Party Congress was then held in Daraa, Syria, from 20 to 25 August 1982. Here it was decided that the organisation would return to Turkish Kurdistan to start an armed guerilla war there for the creation of an independent Kurdish state. Meanwhile, they prepared guerrilla forces in Syria and Lebanon to go to war. However, many PKK leaders were arrested in Turkey and sent to Diyarbakir Prison. Because of the treatment of the prisoners, the prison became the site of much political protest. (See also Torture in Turkey#Deaths in custody.)

In Diyarbakır Prison, PKK member Mazlum Doğan burned himself to death on March 21, 1982, in protest at the treatment in prison. Ferhat Kurtay, Necmi Önen, Mahmut Zengin and Eşref Anyık followed his example on May 17. On July 14, PKK members Kemal Pir, M. Hayri Durmuş, Ali Çiçek and Akif Yılmaz started a hunger strike in Diyarbakır Prison. In 1983, the conflict reached Iraqi Kurdistan as the Kurdistan Region–PKK conflict. Kemal Pir died on September 7, M. Hayri Durmuş on the 12th, Akif Yılmaz on the 15th, and Ali Çiçek on the 17th. On April 13, 1984, a 75-day hunger strike started in Istanbul. As a result, four prisoners—Abdullah Meral, Haydar Başbağ, Fatih Ökütülmüş, and Hasan Telci—died.

On 25 October 1986, the third Congress was held in Beqaa Valley, Lebanon. Issues raised included lack of discipline, growing internal criticism, and splinter groups within the organization. This had led the organisation to execute some internal critics, especially ex-members who had joined Tekosin, a rival Marxist–Leninist organization. Öcalan strongly criticized the leaders responsible for the guerrilla forces during the early 1980s and threatened others with the death penalty, if they joined rival groups or refused to obey orders. The PKK's military defeats meant they were no closer to their primary goal of an independent Kurdistan. Cooperation with criminals and dictators had tarnished the organization's image. During the Congress, the leaders decided to advance the armed struggle, increase the number of fighters, and dissolve the HRK, which was replaced by the Kurdistan Popular Liberation Army (ARGK). A newly established Mahsum Korkmaz Academy, a politico-military academy, replaced the Helve Camp, and a new military conscription policy was approved, which obliged every family to send someone to the guerrilla forces.

The decisions that were taken during the third Congress transformed the PKK from a Leninist organization into one in which power was more concentrated, as Öcalan accrued more Önderlik (leadership). Some of the reasons why Öcalan took power from the other leaders, such as Murat Karayilan, Cemil Bayik and Duran Kalkan, were growing internal conflict and the organization's inability to stop it. According to Michael Gunter, Öcalan, even before this time, had already carried out a purge of many rival PKK members, who were tortured and forced to confess they were traitors before being executed. Ibrahim Halik, Mehmet Ali Cetiner, Mehmet Result Altinok, Saime Askin, Ayten Yildirim and Sabahattin Ali were some of the victims. Later in 2006, Öcalan denied these accusations and stated in his book that both Mahsum Korkmaz, the first supreme military commander of the PKK, and Engin Sincer, a high-ranking commander, likely died as a result of internal conflicts and described the perpetrators as "gangs". Leaked reports, however, revealed the authoritarian personality of Öcalan, who had brutally suppressed dissent and purged opponents since the early 1980s. According to David L. Philips, up to sixty PKK members were executed in 1986, including Mahsum Korkmaz, who he believes was murdered on 28 March 1986. Between the 1980 and 1990, the organization targeted defectors, assassinating two of them in Sweden, two in the Netherlands, three in Germany and one in Denmark.

In 1990, during the fourth Congress, the PKK ended its unpopular conscription policy. The organization's attempts to take into the account the demands and criticism of its support base had helped it to increase its popularity. According to Stanton, the PKK's improved relationship with its civilian base likely created incentives for the government to engage in state terrorism against some of its Kurdish citizens. The PKK was rarely able to prevent this.

First insurgency

1984–1993

The PKK launched its insurgency against the Turkish state on 15 August 1984 with armed attacks on Eruh and Semdinli. During these attacks, one Turkish Gendarmerie soldier was killed and seven soldiers, two policemen and three civilians injured. It was followed by a PKK raid on a police station in Siirt, two days later.

In the early 1990s, President Turgut Özal agreed to negotiations with the PKK, after the 1991 Gulf War changed the geopolitical dynamics in the region. Apart from Özal, himself half-Kurdish, few Turkish politicians were interested in a peace process, nor was more than a part of the PKK itself. In February 1991, during the presidency of Özal, the prohibition of Kurdish music was ended.

In 1992, however, Turkey, backed by the United States and the Peshmerga of the Kurdistan Regional Government (KRG), launched Operation Northern Iraq, a cross-border operation between 9 October and 1 November against the PKK, using more than 300,000 troops. Thousands of local Peshmerga, with the support of more than 20,000 Turkish troops who had crossed the Iraqi border, attacked 10,000 PKK guerrillas. Despite heavy casualties, the PKK managed to  maintain its presence in Iraqi Kurdistan, and a ceasefire agreement was reached between the PKK and KRG. In 1993, Özal returned to working on a peace plan with the former finance minister Adnan Kahveci and the General Commander of the Turkish Gendarmerie, Eşref Bitlis.

Unilateral cease-fire (1993) 
Negotiations led to a unilateral cease-fire by the PKK on 17 March 1993. Accompanied by Jalal Talabani at a press conference in Barelias, Lebanon, Öcalan stated that the PKK no longer sought a separate state, but peace, dialogue, and free political action for Kurds in Turkey within the framework of a democratic state. Süleyman Demirel, the prime minister of Turkey at the time, refused to negotiate with the PKK, but also stated that forced Turkification was the wrong approach towards the Kurds. Several Kurdish politicians supported the ceasefire, and Kemal Burkay and Ahmet Türk of the People's Labor Party (HEP) were also present at the press conference.

With the PKK's ceasefire declaration in hand, Özal was planning to propose a major pro-Kurdish reform package at the next meeting of the National Security Council. The president's death on 17 April led to the postponement of that meeting, and the plans were never presented. A Turkish army attack on the PKK on 19 May 1993 in Kulp brought the ceasefire to an end. Five days later, the PKK carried out the Çewlik massacre. Former PKK commander turned whistleblower Şemdin Sakık has said that the massacre had been allowed to go ahead by the Turkish military, and was part of the Doğu Çalışma Grubu's coup plans. On the 8 June 1993, Öcalan announced the end of the PKK ceasefire.

Insurgency (1993–1995) 
Under the new Presidency of Süleyman Demirel and Premiership of Tansu Çiller, the Castle Plan (to use any and all violent means to solve the Kurdish question), which Özal had opposed, was enacted, and the peace process abandoned. Some journalists and politicians maintain that Özal's death (allegedly by poison), along with the assassination of a number of political and military figures supporting his peace efforts, was part of a covert military coup in 1993 aimed at stopping the peace plans.

To counter the PKK, the Turkish military started new counter-insurgency strategies between 1992 and 1995. To deprive the rebels of a logistical base of operations and punish local people supporting the PKK, the military carried out deforestation of the countryside and destroyed over 3,000 Kurdish villages, causing at least 2 million refugees. Most of these villages were evacuated, but other villages were burned, bombed, or shelled by government forces, and several villages were obliterated from the air. While some were destroyed or evacuated, other villages agreed to join the side of the government. The state offered salaries to local farmers and shepherds to join the Village Guards, to prevent the PKK from operating in these villages. Villages which refused to cooperate were evacuated by the military. These tactics managed to drive the rebels from the cities and villages into the mountains, although they still often launched reprisals on pro-government villages, which included attacks on civilians. Turkish armed forces reported that on 26 May 1994, the Turkish Air Force targeted the Kurdistan Workers' Party (PKK) militants by bombing North Iraq, and killing 79 militants. During Newroz (the Kurdish New Year) in March 1995, the Turkish military launched its largest military operation against the PKK in Iraq. A force of 35,000 troops invaded Iraqi Kurdistan, assisted by tanks and F-16 jets. The Turkish army occupied several towns in which they searched for and seized Kurdish rebels.

Unilateral ceasefire (1995–1996) 
In December 1995, the PKK announced a second unilateral ceasefire, ahead of the general elections on 24 December 1995. This was aimed at giving the new Turkish government time to articulate a way of resolving the conflict. During the ceasefire, civil society groups organized several peace initiatives in support of a solution to the conflict. But in May 1996, there was an attempt to assassinate Abdullah Öcalan in Damascus, and in June of the same year the Turkish military began to pursue the PKK into Iraqi Kurdistan. The PKK announced the end of the unilateral ceasefire on 16 August 1996, stating that it was still ready for peace negotiations as a political solution.

Insurgency (1996–1999) 
One of the turning points in the conflict was when Turkey did the largest cross-border mission in its history. Operation Hammer (1997) was done in May of 1997 and over fifty thousand Turkish soldiers and ten thousand village guards took part in the operation. The operation was successful as the Turkish military killed over three thousand terrorists and captured more than four hundred in just two months and destroyed almost all of the terrorist camps in Northern Iraq with just 114 martyrs on their side. Another turning point in the conflict came in 1998, when, after political pressure and military threats from the Turkish government against Syria, the PKK's leader, Abdullah Öcalan, was forced to leave Syria, where he had been in exile since September 1980. He first went to Russia, then to Italy and Greece. He was eventually brought to the Greek embassy in Nairobi, Kenya. After leaving the embassy on 15 February 1999 for the airport, he was kidnapped in a joint MİT-CIA operation and brought to Turkey, which resulted in major protests by Kurds worldwide. Three Kurdish protestors were shot dead when trying to enter the Israeli consulate in Berlin to protest alleged Israeli involvement in his capture. Although the capture of Öcalan ended a third cease-fire which Öcalan had declared on 1 August 1998, on 1 September 1999 the PKK declared a unilateral cease-fire which would last until 2004.

Unilateral cease-fire (1999–2003)

After the unilateral cease-fire the PKK declared in September 1999, their forces fully withdrew from Turkish Kurdistan, set up new bases in the Qandil Mountains of Iraqi Kurdistan, and in February 2000 they declared the formal end of the war. After this, the PKK said it would switch its strategy to using peaceful methods to achieve their objectives. In April 2002, the PKK changed its name to KADEK (Kurdistan Freedom and Democracy Congress), claiming the PKK had fulfilled its mission and would now move on as purely political organisation. In October 2003 the KADEK announced its dissolution and declared the creation of a new organisation: KONGRA-GEL (Kurdistan Peoples Congress).

Offers by the PKK for negotiations were ignored by the Turkish government, which claimed that the KONGRA-GEL continued to carry out armed attacks in the 1999–2004 period, although not on the same scale as before September 1999. They also blame the KONGRA-GEL for Kurdish riots which happened during the period. The PKK argues that all of its military activity during this period was defensive, as the Turkish military launched some 700 raids against their bases, including in Northern Iraq. Despite the KONGRA-GEL cease-fire, other groups continued their armed activities. For example, the Revolutionary Party of Kurdistan (PŞK) tried to use the cease-fire to attract PKK fighters to join their organisation. The Kurdistan Freedom Hawks (TAK) were formed during this period by radical KONGRA-GEL commanders dissatisfied with the cease-fire. The period after the capture of Öcalan was used by the Turkish government to launch major crackdown operations against the Turkish Hezbollah (Kurdish Hezbollah), arresting 3,300 Hizbullah members in 2000, compared to 130 in 1998, and killing the group's leader Hüseyin Velioğlu on 13 January 2000. During this phase of the war at least 145 people were killed during fighting between the PKK and security forces.

After the AK Party came to power in 2002, the Turkish state started to ease restrictions on the Kurdish language and culture.

From 2003 to 2004 there was a power struggle inside the KONGRA-GEL between a reformist wing which wanted the organisation to disarm completely and a traditionalist wing which wanted the organisation to resume its armed insurgency once again. The conservative wing of the organisation won this power struggle forcing reformist leaders such as Kani Yilmaz, Nizamettin Tas and Abdullah Öcalan's younger brother Osman Öcalan to leave the organisation. The three major traditionalist leaders, Murat Karayilan, Cemil Bayik and Bahoz Erdal formed the new leadership committee of the organisation. The new administration decided to restart the insurgency, because they claimed that without guerillas the PKK's political activities would remain unsuccessful. This came as the pro-Kurdish People's Democracy Party (HADEP) was banned by the Turkish Supreme Court on 13 March 2003 and its leader Murat Bozlak was imprisoned.

In April 2005, KONGRA-GEL changed its name back to PKK. Because not all of the KONGRA-GEL's elements accepted this, the organisation has also been referred to as the New PKK. The KONGRA-GEL has since become the Legislative Assembly of the Kurdistan Communities Union, a pan-Kurdish umbrella organisation which includes the PKK. Ex-DEP member Zübeyir Aydar is the President of the KONGRA-GEL.

Through the cease-fire years 2000–2003, some 711 people were killed, according to the Turkish government. The Uppsala Conflict Data Program put casualties during these years at 368 to 467 killed.

Insurgency (2004–2012)

2003–2005

In September 2003, the PKK declared an end to its cease-fire, but waited until mid-2004 before going on the offensive again. In June 2004, the PKK resumed its armed activities because they claimed the Turkish government was ignoring their calls for negotiations and was still attacking their forces. The government claimed that in that same month, some 2,000 Kurdish guerrillas entered Turkey via Iraqi Kurdistan. The PKK, now lacking Syrian government support and the manpower they had in the 1990s, took up new tactics. It reduced the size of its field units from 15 to 20 fighters to teams of 6–8, and avoided direct confrontations, relying more on the use of landmines, snipers and small ambushes, using hit and run tactics. Another change in PKK tactics was that the organisation no longer attempted to control any territory, not even after dark. Violence increased throughout 2004 and 2005 during which the PKK was blamed for dozens of bombings in Western Turkey throughout 2005, including the 2005 Kuşadası minibus bombing (which killed five), although the PKK denied responsibility.

2006
In March 2006 heavy fighting broke out around Diyarbakir between the PKK and Turkish security forces, as well as large riots because of "local anger over high unemployment, poverty and Ankara's reluctance to grant more autonomy to the mainly Kurdish region". The army closed the roads to Diyarbakır Airport and shut down many schools and businesses. In August, the Kurdistan Freedom Hawks (TAK), which vowed to "turn Turkey into hell", launched a major bombing campaign. On 25 August two coordinated low-level blasts targeted a bank in Adana, on 27 August a school in Istanbul was targeted by a bombing, on 28 August there were three coordinated attacks in Marmaris and one in Antalya targeting the tourist industry and on 30 August there was a TAK bombing in Mersin. These bombings were condemned by the PKK, which declared its fifth cease-fire on 1 October 2006, which lessened the intensity of the conflict. Minor clashes continued due to Turkish military operations. In total, the conflict claimed over 500 lives in 2006. 2006 also saw the PKK assassinate one of their former commanders, Kani Yilmaz, in February, in Iraq.

2007
In May 2007, there was a bombing in Ankara that killed 6 and injured 121 people. The Turkish government alleged the PKK was responsible for the bombing. On 4 June, a PKK suicide bombing in Tunceli killed seven soldiers and wounded six at a military base. Tensions across the Iraqi border also started playing up as Turkish forces entered Iraq several times in pursuit of PKK fighting and In June, as 4 soldiers were killed by landmines, large areas of Iraqi Kurdistan were shelled which damaged 9 villages and forced residents to flee. On 7 October 2007, 40–50 PKK fighters ambushed an 18-man Turkish commando unit in the Gabar mountains, killing 15 commandos and injuring three, which made it the deadliest PKK attack since the 1990s. In response a law was passed allowing the Turkish military to take action inside Iraqi territory. Then on 21 October 2007, 150–200 militants attacked an outpost, in Dağlıca, Yüksekova, manned by a 50 man infantry unit. The outpost was almost overrun and the PKK killed 12, wounded 17 and captured 6 Turkish soldiers which were released later. They then withdrew into Iraqi Kurdistan. The Turkish military killed 32 PKK fighters in hot pursuit operations, after the attack, however this was denied by the PKK. The Turkish military responded by bombing PKK bases on 24 October and started preparing for a major cross-border military operation.

2008
This major cross-border offensive, dubbed Operation Sun, started on 21 February 2008 and was preceded by an aerial offensive against PKK camps in northern Iraq, which began on 16 December 2007. Between 3,000 and 10,000 Turkish forces took part in the offensive. According to the Turkish military around 230 PKK fighters were killed in the ground offensive, while 27 Turkish forces were killed. According to the PKK, over 125 Turkish forces were killed, while PKK casualties were in the tens. Smaller scale Turkish operations against PKK bases in Iraqi Kurdistan continued afterwards. On 27 July 2008, Turkey blamed the PKK for an Istanbul double-bombing which killed 17 and injured 154 people. The PKK denied any involvement. On 4 October, the most violent clashes since the October 2007 clashes in Hakkari erupted as the PKK attacked the Aktutun border post in Şemdinli in the Hakkâri Province, at night. 15 Turkish soldiers were killed and 20 were injured, meanwhile 23 PKK fighters were said to be killed during the fighting. On 10 November, the Iranian Kurdish insurgent group PJAK declared it would be halting operations inside Iran to start fighting the Turkish military.

2009
At the start of 2009 Turkey opened its first Kurdish-language TV-channel, TRT 6, and on 19 March 2009 local elections were held in Turkey in which the pro-Kurdish Democratic Society Party (DTP) won a majority of the vote in the South East. Soon after, on 13 April 2009, the PKK declared its sixth ceasefire, after Abdullah Öcalan called on them to end military operations and prepare for peace. The following day the Turkish authorities arrested 53 Kurdish politicians of the Democratic Society Party (DTP). In September Turkey's Erdoğan-government launched the Kurdish initiative, which included plans to rename Kurdish villages that had been given Turkish names, expand the scope of the freedom of expression, restore Turkish citizenship to Kurdish refugees, strengthen local governments, and extend a partial amnesty for PKK fighters. But the plans for the Kurdish initiative where heavily hurt after the DTP was banned by the Turkish constitutional court on 11 December 2009 and its leaders were subsequently put on trial for terrorism. A total of 1,400 DTP members were arrested and 900 detained in the government crackdown against the party. This caused major riots by Kurds all over Turkey and resulted in violent clashes between pro-Kurdish and security forces as well as pro-Turkish demonstrators, which resulted in several injuries and fatalities. On 7 December the PKK launched an ambush in Reşadiye which killed seven and injured three Turkish soldiers, which became the deadliest PKK attack in that region since the 1990s.

2010
On 1 May 2010 the PKK declared an end to its cease-fire, launching an attack in Tunceli that killed four and injured seven soldiers. On 31 May, Abdullah Öcalan declared an end to his attempts at re-approachment and establishing dialogue with the Turkish government, leaving PKK top commanders in charge of the conflict. The PKK then stepped up its armed activities, starting with a missile attack on a navy base in İskenderun, killing 7 and wounding 6 soldiers. On 18 and 19 June, heavy fighting broke out that resulted in the death of 12 PKK fighters, 12 Turkish soldiers and injury of 17 Turkish soldiers, as the PKK launched three separate attacks in Hakkari and Elazig provinces.

Another major attack in Hakkari occurred on 20 July 2010, killing six and wounding seventeen Turkish soldiers, with one PKK fighter being killed. The next day, Murat Karayilan, the leader of the PKK, announced that the PKK would lay down its arms if the Kurdish issue would be resolved through dialogue and threatened to declare independence if this demand was not met. Turkish authorities claimed they had killed 187 and captured 160 PKK fighters by 14 July. By 27 July, Turkish news sources reported the deaths of over 100 security forces, which exceeded the entire 2009 toll. On 12 August, however, a ramadan cease-fire was declared by the PKK. In November the cease-fire was extended until the Turkish general election on 12 June 2011, despite alleging that Turkey had launched over 80 military operations against them during this period. Despite the truce, the PKK responded to these military operations by launching retaliatory attacks in Siirt and Hakkari provinces, killing 12 Turkish soldiers.

2011

The cease-fire was revoked early, on 28 February 2011. Soon afterwards three PKK fighters were killed while trying to get into Turkey through northern Iraq. In May, counter-insurgency operations left 12 PKK fighters and 5 soldiers dead. This then resulted in major Kurdish protests across Turkey as part of a civil disobedience campaign launched by the pro-Kurdish Peace and Democracy Party (BDP), during these protests 2 people were killed, 308 injured and 2,506 arrested by Turkish authorities. The 12 June elections saw a historical performance for the pro-Kurdish Peace and Democracy Party (BDP) which won 36 seats in the South-East, which was more than the ruling Justice and Development Party (AKP), which won only 30 seats in Kurdish areas. However, six of the 36 elected BDP deputies remain in Turkish jails as of June 2011. One of the six jailed deputies, Hatip Dicle, was then stripped of his elected position by the constitutional court, after which the 30 free MPs declared a boycott of Turkish parliament. The PKK intensified its campaign again, in July killing 20 Turkish soldiers in two weeks, during which at least 10 PKK fighters were killed. On 17 August 2011, the Turkish Armed Forces launched multiple raids against Kurdish rebels, striking 132 targets. Turkish military bombed PKK targets in northern Iraq in six days of air raids, according to General Staff, where 90–100 PKK Soldiers were killed, and at least 80 injured. From July to September Iran carried out an offensive against the PJAK in Northern Iraq, which resulted in a cease-fire on 29 September. After the cease-fire the PJAK withdrew its forces from Iran and joined with the PKK to fight Turkey. Turkish counter-terrorism operations reported a sharp increase of Iranian citizens among the insurgents killed in October and November, such as the six PJAK fighters killed in Çukurca on 28 October. On 19 October, twenty-six Turkish soldiers were killed and 18 injured in 8 simultaneous PKK attacks in Cukurca and Yuksekova, in Hakkari provieen 10,000 and 15,000 full-time, which is the highest it has ever been.

2012
In summer 2012, the conflict with the PKK took a violent curve, in parallel with the Syrian civil war as President Bashar al-Assad ceded control of several Kurdish cities in Syria to the PYD, the Syrian affiliate of the PKK, and Turkey armed ISIS and other Islamic groups against Kurds. Turkish foreign minister Ahmet Davutoglu accused the Assad government of arming the group. In June and August there were heavy clashes in Hakkari province, described as the most violent in years. as the PKK attempted to seize control of Şemdinli and engage the Turkish army in a "frontal battle" by blocking the roads leading to the town from Iran and Iraq and setting up DShK heavy machine guns and rocket launchers on high ground to ambush Turkish motorized units that would be sent to re-take the town. However the Turkish army avoided the trap by destroying the heavy weapons from the air and using long range artillery to root out the PKK. The Turkish military declared operation was ended successfully on 11 August, claiming to have killed 115 guerrillas and lost only six soldiers and two village guards. On 20 August, eight people were killed and 66 wounded by a deadly bombing in Gaziantep. According to the KCK 400 incidents of shelling, air bombardment and armed clashes occurred in August. On 24 September, Turkish General Necdet Özel claimed that 110 Turkish soldiers and 475 PKK militants had been killed since the start of 2012.

Peace process 2012–2015

On 28 December 2012, in a television interview upon a question of whether the government had a project to solve the issue, Erdoğan said that the government was conducting negotiations with jailed rebel leader Öcalan. Negotiations  were initially named as Solution Process (Çözüm Süreci) in public. While negotiations were going on, there were numerous events that were regarded as sabotage to derail the talks: The assassination of the PKK administrators Sakine Cansız, Fidan Doğan and Leyla Söylemez in Paris, revealing Öcalan's talks with the pro-Kurdish party Peoples' Democratic Party (HDP) to the public via the Milliyet newspaper and finally, the bombings of the Justice Ministry of Turkey and Erdoğan's office at the Ak Party headquarters in Ankara. However, both parties vehemently condemned all three events as they occurred and stated that they were determined anyway. Finally on 21 March 2013, after months of negotiations with the Turkish Government, Abdullah Ocalan's letter to people was read both in Turkish and Kurdish during Nowruz celebrations in Diyarbakır. The letter called a cease-fire that included disarmament and withdrawal from Turkish soil and calling an end to armed struggle. PKK announced that they would obey, stating that the year of 2013 is the year of solution either through war or through peace. Erdoğan welcomed the letter stating that concrete steps will follow PKK's withdrawal.

On 25 April 2013, PKK announced that it would be withdrawing all its forces within Turkey to northern Iraq. According to the Turkish government and the Kurds and most of the press, this move marks the end of 30-year-old conflict. Second phase which includes constitutional and legal changes towards the recognition of human rights of the Kurds starts simultaneously with withdrawal.

Escalation

On 6 and 7 October 2014, riots erupted in various cities in Turkey for protesting the Siege of Kobane. The Kurds accused the Turkish government of supporting ISIS and not letting people send support for Kobane Kurds. Protesters were met with tear gas and water cannons. 37 people were killed in protests. During these protests, there were deadly clashes between PKK and Hizbullah sympathizers. 3 soldiers were killed by PKK in January 2015, as a sign of rising tensions in the country.

2015–present

In June 2015,  the main Syrian Kurdish militia, YPG, and the Turkey's main pro-Kurdish party, HDP, accused Turkey of allowing Islamic State (ISIL) soldiers to cross its border and attack the Kurdish city of Kobanî in Syria. The conflict between Turkey and PKK escalated following the 20 July 2015 Suruç bombing attack on progressive activists, which was claimed by ISIL. During the 24–25 July 2015 Operation Martyr Yalçın, Turkey bombed alleged PKK bases in Iraq and PYD bases in Syria's Kurdish region Rojava, purportedly retaliating the killing of two policeman in the town of Ceylanpınar (which the PKK denied carrying out) and effectively ending the cease-fire (after many months of increasing tensions). Turkish warplanes also bombed YPG bases in Syria.

Violence soon spread throughout Turkey. Many Kurdish businesses were destroyed by mobs. The headquarters and branches of the pro-Kurdish Peoples' Democratic Party (HDP) were also attacked. There are reports of civilians being killed in several Kurdish-populated towns and villages. The Council of Europe raised their concerns over the attacks on civilians and the 4 September 2015 blockade of Cizre.

But also the Kurdish rebel fighters did not sit still: a Turkish Governor claimed that Kurdish assailants had fired on a police vehicle in Adana in September 2015, killing two officers, and some unspecified "clash" with PKK rebels purportedly took place in Hakkâri Province. President Erdogan claimed that between 23 July and late September, 150 Turkish officers and 2,000 Kurdish rebels had been killed. In December 2015, Turkish military operations in the Kurdish regions of southeastern Turkey had killed hundreds of civilians, displaced hundreds of thousands and caused massive destruction in residential areas. According to the Human Rights Watch (HRW) report, "Local human rights groups have recorded well over 100 civilian deaths and multiple injuries."

The spring of 2016 saw the seasonal uptick in combat activity. In May, a Turkish Bell AH-1 SuperCobra helicopter was documented shot down by a PKK-fired Russian made MANPADS.

On May 6, 2016, HBDH, an umbrella organization built around the Kurdish PKK, attacked a Gendarmerie General Command base in Giresun Province in northeastern Turkey. According to news reports, a roadside bomb exploded, targeting a Gendarmerie vehicle. HDBH claimed responsibility for the attack on May 8, stating that three gendarmes died in the attack, as well as the Base Commander, who was the intended target.
the Joint Command of the HBDH has claimed responsibility for several more attacks in the region, primarily targeting Turkish soldiers or gendarmes. The tactics employed by the alliance are very similar to those used by the PKK. The most notable attack came on 19 July 2016, just 4 days after the 2016 Turkish coup d'état attempt. HBDH reported that they had killed 11 Turkish riot police in Trabzon Province at 08:30 that morning. The HBDH report is consistent in time and location to an attack reported by Doğan News Agency, in which "unknown assailants" fired on a police checkpoint. This report states that 3 officers were killed and 5 were injured, along with a civilian.

In January 2018, the Turkish military and its Free Syrian Army and Sham Legion allies began a cross-border operation in the Kurdish-majority Afrin Canton in Northern Syria, against the Kurdish-led Democratic Union Party in Syria (PYD) and the U.S.-supported YPG Kurdish militia. In March 2018, Turkey launched military operations to eliminate the Kurdish PKK fighters in northern Iraq. This failed however, as the PKK has expanded its operations in Iraq.

In October 2019, the Turkish force launched an operation against Syrian Kurds in the Northern Syria which has been termed Operation Peace Spring.

On 14 February 2021, Turkish Minister of Defense Hulusi Akar claimed that 13 soldiers and police officers, who had been held hostage by the PKK since 2015 and 2016, were executed during an attempted rescue operation. Erdoğan blamed the United States and Kurdish politicians for the failed operation, while CHP leader Kılıçdaroğlu accused Erdoğan of being responsible for the deaths. The PKK claimed the hostages were killed by Turkish airstrikes during the operation. The father of one deceased hostage Semih Özbey was summoned to identify his son, and according to the Turkish Human Rights Association president, stated he saw a bullet wound in his son's head. In an interview with Sözcü, the father noted he believed the hostages were executed, but was only shown a picture of his son's face and was refused seeing his body. He added that during his sons imprisonment he spoke repeatedly to both HDP MPs and Erdoğan to no avail. The Turkish Human Rights Association, which had previously helped return hostages from the PKK, stated their offers to help negotiate were rejected by state officials.

On the 17 April 2022, Operation Claw-Lock began involving a cross border offensive operation into Iraqi Kurdistan allegedly (PKK claim) with the support of the KDP and targeted areas including Metina, Zap and Avashin. The operation is currently ongoing.

In May 2022, while calls for Sweden and Finland were made to join the NATO alliance, Turkey opposed their adhesion unless these countries crack down on local Kurdish and Gulenist networks. The move has been commented as a political card to distract from ongoing economic crisis in Turkey and better engage in upcoming elections, taking an aggressive posture against foreign powers and Kurds being favorable to AKP. On 28 June, the first day of the 2022 NATO summit in Madrid, the Turkish delegation dropped their opposition to Finland and Sweden's NATO membership applications and signed a tripartite memorandum addressing Turkey's concerns regarding arms exports and the Kurdish–Turkish conflict. On 30 June 2022, Turkish President Recep Tayyip Erdoğan said that Sweden had made a "promise" to extradite "73 terrorists" wanted by Turkey.

On 13 November 2022, a bombing in Istanbul killed six people. Turkey says the bomb was planted by a Kurdish Syrian separatist whom they arrested. On 20 November, Turkey launched Operation Claw-Sword - airstrikes on PKK positions in Iraq and Syrian Democratic Forces positions in Syria.

Serhildan

The Serhildan, or people's uprising, started on 14 March 1990, Nusaybin during the funeral of 20-year-old PKK fighter Kamuran Dundar, who along with 13 other fighters was killed by the Turkish military after crossing into Turkey via Syria several days earlier. Dundar came from a Kurdish nationalist family which claimed his body and held a funeral for him in Nusaybin in which he was brought to the city's main mosque and 5000 people which held a march. On the way back the march turned violent and protesters clashed with the police, during which both sides fired upon each other and many people were injured. A curfew was then placed in Nusaybin, tanks and special forces were brought in and some 700 people were arrested. Riots spread to nearby towns and in Cizre over 15,000 people, constituting about half the town's population took part in riots in which five people were killed, 80 injured and 155 arrested. Widespread riots took place throughout the Southeast on Nowruz, the Kurdish new-year celebrations, which at the time were banned. Protests slowed down over the next two weeks as many started to stay home and Turkish forces were ordered not to intervene unless absolutely necessarily but factory sit-ins, go-slows, work boycotts and "unauthorized" strikes were still held although in protest of the state.

Protests are often held on 21 March, or Nowruz. Most notably in 1992, when thousands of protesters clashed with security forces all over the country and where the army allegedly disobeyed an order from President Suleyman Demirel not to attack the protest. In the heavy violence that ensued during that year's Nowroz protest some 55 people were killed, mainly in  Şırnak (26 killed), Cizre (29 killed) and Nusaybin (14 killed) and it included a police officer and a soldier. Over 200 people were injured and another 200 were arrested. According to Governor of Şırnak, Mustafa Malay, the violence was caused by 500 to 1,500 armed rebels which he alleged, entered the town during the festival. However, he conceded that "the security forces did not establish their targets properly and caused great damage to civilian houses."

Since Abdullah Öcalan's capture on 15 February 1998, protests are also held every year on that date.

Casualties

According to figures released by the Anadolu Agency, citing a Turkish security source, from 1984 to August 2015, there were 36,345 deaths in the conflict. This included 6,741 civilians, 7,230 security forces (5,347 soldiers, 1,466 village guards and 283 policemen) and 22,374 PKK fighters by August 2015 in Turkey alone. Among the civilian casualties, till 2012, 157 were teachers. From August 1984 to June 2007, a total of 13,327 soldiers and 7,620 civilians were said to have been wounded. About 2,500 people were said to have been killed between 1984 and 1991, while over 17,500 were killed between 1991 and 1995. The number of murders committed by Village Guards from 1985 to 1996 is put at 296 by official estimates.

Contrary to the newest estimate, earlier figures by the Turkish military put the number of PKK casualties much higher, with 26,128 PKK dead by June 2007, and 29,704 by March 2009. Between the start of the second insurgency in 2004, and March 2009, 2,462 PKK militants were claimed killed. However, later figures provided by the military for the 1984–2012 period, revised down the number of killed PKK members to 21,800.

Both the PKK and Turkish military have accused each other of civilian deaths. Since the 1970s, the European Court of Human Rights has condemned Turkey for the thousands of human rights abuses against Kurdish people. The judgments are related to systematic executions of Kurdish civilians, torturing, forced displacements, thousands of destroyed villages, arbitrary arrests, murdered and disappeared Kurdish journalists, politicians and activists. Turkey has been also condemned for killing Kurdish civilians and blaming the PKK in the ECHR (Kuskonar massacre).

According to human rights organisations since the beginning of the uprising 4,000 villages have been destroyed, in which between 380,000 and 1,000,000 Kurdish villagers have been forcibly evacuated from their homes, mainly by the Turkish military. According to the Los Angeles Times some 5,000 Turks and 35,000 Kurds, have been killed, 17,000 Kurds have disappeared and 119,000 Kurds have been imprisoned as a result of the conflict. According to the Humanitarian Law Project, 2,400 Kurdish villages were destroyed and 18,000 Kurds were executed, by the Turkish government. In total up to 3,000,000 people (mainly Kurds) have been displaced by the conflict, an estimated 1,000,000 of which are still internally displaced as of 2009. The Assyrian Minority was heavily affected as well, as now most (50–60 thousand/70,000) of its population is in refuge in Europe.

Sebahat Tuncel, an elected MP from the BDP, put the PKK's casualties at 18,000 as of July 2011.

Before 2012 ceasefire 
The Uppsala Conflict Data Program recorded 25,825–30,639 casualties to date, 22,729–25,984 of which having died during the first insurgency, 368–467 during the cease-fire and 2,728–4,188 during the second insurgency. Casualties from 1989 to 2011, according to the UCDP are as following:

The conflict's casualties between 1984 and March 2009 according to the General Staff of the Republic of Turkey, Turkish Gendarmerie, General Directorate of Security and since then until June 2010 according to Milliyet's analysis of the data of the General Staff of the Republic of Turkey and Turkish Gendarmerie were as following:

Since 2013: from ceasefire to new confrontations 
The Belgium-based Crisis Group keeps track of casualties linked to the Kuridsh–Turkish conflict. This data is limited to proper Turkey, and does not include casualties from preemptive operations in Syria or Iraq.

*: mainly due to the 6–8 October 2014 Kurdish riots where 42 civilians were killed by State Forces during anti-government protests by Kurdish groups throughout Turkey. The protesters denouncing Ankara position during Islamic State's siege of Kobani. This is the main incident out of the ceasefire period.

The ceasefire agreement broke down in July 2015, dividing 2015 in two sharply different periods.

External operations 
Turkey has led strikes and several ground operations in Syria and Iraq, in order to attack groups Turkey classifies as PKK-related.

*:these names by Turkey military or political leadership have communication / propaganda purposes
**:  Most of Turkey's Operation Euphrates Shield combats were between TSK & TFSA against IS on one side, and between YPG against IS on the other, while the Turkish forces and US-allied YPG avoided full scale clashed. Turkey strategic objective was to prevent Afrin canton from connecting with YPG Manbij and other Rojava regions. Accordingly, only a minor part of these operations casualties were from Turkey forces vs YPG forces.

Demographic effect

The Turkification of predominantly Kurdish areas in Turkey's East and South-East were also bound in the early ideas and policies of modern Turkish nationalism, going back to as early as 1918 to the manifesto of Turkish nationalist Ziya Gökalp "Turkification, Islamization and Modernization". The evolving Young Turk conscience adopted a specific interpretation of progressism, a trend of thought which emphasizes the human ability to make, improve and reshape human society, relying on science, technology and experimentation. This notion of social evolution was used to support and justify policies of population control. The Kurdish rebellions provided a comfortable pretext for Turkish Kemalists to implement such ideas, and in a Settlement Law was issued in 1934. It created a complex pattern of interaction between state of society, in which the regime favored its people in a distant geography, populated by locals marked as hostile.

During the 1990s, a predominantly Kurdish-dominated Eastern and South-Eastern Turkey (Kurdistan) was depopulated due to the Kurdish–Turkish conflict. Turkey depopulated and destroyed rural settlements on a large scale, resulting in massive resettlement of a rural Kurdish population in urban areas and leading to development and re-design of population settlement schemes across the countryside. According to Dr. Joost Jongerden, Turkish settlement and re-settlement policies during the 1990s period were influenced by two different forces – the desire to expand administration to rural areas and an alternative view of urbanization, allegedly producing "Turkishness".

Human rights abuses
Both Turkey and the PKK have committed numerous human rights abuses during the conflict.
Former French ambassador to Turkey Eric Rouleau states:

According to the Ministry of Justice, in addition to the 35,000 people killed in military campaigns, 17,500 were assassinated between 1984, when the conflict began, and 1998. An additional 1,000 people were reportedly assassinated in the first nine months of 1999. According to the Turkish press, the authors of these crimes, none of whom have been arrested, belong to groups of mercenaries working either directly or indirectly for the security agencies.

Abuses by the Turkish side

Since the 1970s, the European Court of Human Rights has condemned Turkey for thousands of human rights abuses against Kurdish people. The judgments are related to systematic executions of Kurdish civilians, forced recruitments, torturing, forced displacements, thousands of destroyed villages, arbitrary arrests, murdered and disappeared Kurdish journalists. The latest judgments are from 2014. According to David L. Philips, more than 1,500 people affiliated with the Kurdish opposition parties and organizations were murdered by unidentified assailants between 1986 and 1996. The government backed mercenaries assassinated hundreds of suspected PKK sympathizers. The Turkish government is held responsible by Turkish human rights organizations for at least 3,438 civilian deaths in the conflict between 1987 and 2000.

Massacres

In November 1992, the Turkish gendarmerie officers forced the leader of the Kelekçi village to evacuate all of the inhabitants, before shooting at them and their houses with heavy weapons. The soldiers set up fire to nine houses and forced all villagers to flee. Later soldiers burned the rest of the village and destroyed all 136 houses.

In 1993, Mehmet Ogut, his pregnant wife and all their seven children were burned to death by Turkish special forces soldiers. The Turkish authorities initially blamed the PKK and refused to investigate the case until it was opened again 17 years later. The investigations eventually came to an end in late 2014 with sentences of life imprisonment for three gendarme officers, a member of the special forces and nine soldiers.

In August 1993, Turkish security forces opened fire during the protest, killing 10 people and wounding 51.

On 8 September 1993, the Turkish Air Force dropped a bomb near the Munzur mountains, killing 2 women. In the same year, Turkish security forces attacked the town of Lice, destroying 401 houses, 242 shops and massacring more than thirty civilians, and leaving one hundred wounded.

On 26 March 1994 the Turkish military planes (F-16's) and a helicopter circled two villages and bombed them, killing 38 Kurdish civilians. The Turkish authorities blamed the PKK and took pictures of the dead children and spread in the press. The European Court of Human rights condemned Turkey to pay 2,3 million euros to the families of victims. The event is known as the Kuşkonar massacre.

In 1995, Human Rights Watch reported that it was common practice for Turkish soldiers to kill Kurdish civilians and take pictures of their corpses with weapons they carried only for staging the events. Killed civilians were shown to press as PKK "terrorists".

In 1995, The European newspaper published in its front-page pictures of Turkish soldiers who posed for camera with the decapitated heads of the Kurdish PKK fighters. Kurdish fighters were beheaded by Turkish special forces soldiers.

In late March 2006, the Turkish security forces who tried to prevent the funerals of the PKK fighters clashed with the demonstrators, killing at least eight Kurdish protesters, including four children under the age of 10.

In August 2015, Amnesty International reported that the Turkish government airstrikes killed eight residents and injured at least eight others – including a child – in a flagrantly unlawful attack on the village of Zergele, in the Kandil Mountains in the Kurdistan Region of Iraq.

On 21 January 2016, a report published by Amnesty International stated that more than 150 civilians had been killed in Cizre. According to Amnesty International, the curfews had been imposed in more than 19 different towns and districts, putting the lives of hundreds of thousands of people at risk. Additionally, the report stated that the government's disproportionate restrictions on movement and other arbitrary measures were resembling collective punishment, a war crime under the 1949 Geneva Conventions.

In 2019, Turkish soldiers killed 11 Kurdish civilians, 8 of them children in artillery attack.

Human Rights Watch notes in 1992 that:
 As Human Rights Watch has often reported and condemned, Turkish government forces have, during the conflict with the PKK, also committed serious violations of international human rights and humanitarian law, including torture, extrajudicial killings, and indiscriminate fire. We continue to demand that the Turkish government investigate and hold accountable those members of its security forces responsible for these violations. Nonetheless, under international law, the government abuses cannot under any circumstances be seen to justify or excuse those committed by Ocalan's PKK.
 The Kurdish Workers Party (PKK), a separatist group that espouses the use of violence for political ends, continues to wage guerrilla warfare in the southeast, frequently in violation of international humanitarian law, or the laws of war. Instead of attempting to capture, question and indict people suspected of illegal activity, Turkish security forces killed suspects in house raids, thus acting as investigator, judge, jury and executioner. Police routinely asserted that such deaths occurred in shoot-outs between police and "terrorists". In many cases, eyewitnesses reported that no firing came from the attacked house or apartment. Reliable reports indicated that while the occupants of raided premises were shot and killed, no police were killed or wounded during the raids. This discrepancy suggests that the killings were summary, extrajudicial executions, in violation of international human rights and humanitarian law.

Turkish–Kurdish human rights activists in Germany accused Turkey of using chemical weapons against PKK. Hans Baumann, a German expert on photo forgeries, investigated the authenticity of the photos and claimed that the photos were authentic. A forensics report released by the Hamburg University Hospital has backed the allegations. Claudia Roth from Germany's Green Party demanded an explanation from the Turkish government. The Turkish Foreign Ministry spokesman Selçuk Ünal commented on the issue. He said that he did not need to emphasize that the accusations were groundless. He added that Turkey signed to the Chemical Weapons Convention in 1997, and Turkey did not possess chemical weapons.

In response to the activities of the PKK, the Turkish government placed Southeastern Anatolia, where citizens of Kurdish descent are in the majority, under military rule. The Turkish Army and the Kurdish village guards loyal to it have abused Kurdish civilians, resulting in mass migrations to cities. The Government claimed that the displacement policy aimed to remove the shelter and support of the local population and consequently, the population of cities such as Diyarbakır and Cizre more than doubled. However, martial law and military rule was lifted in the last provinces in 2002.

State terrorism

Since its foundation, the Republic of Turkey has pursued variously assimilationist and repressive policies towards the Kurdish people. At the beginning of the conflict, the PKK's relationship with its civilian supporters created incentives for the Turkish government to use terrorism against the Kurdish citizens in the Kurdish dominated southeast region of Turkey. Since the early 1980s, the authorities have systematically used arbitrary arrests, executions of suspects, excessive force, and torture to suppress the opponents. In 1993, the report published by Human Rights Watch stated:

According to Human Rights Watch, the authorities even executed the Kurdish civilians and took the pictures of their corpses with the weapons, they carried for staging the events, in order to show them as Kurdistan Workers Party (PKK) "terrorists" to press. In 1995, another report published by Human Rights Watch stated:

Shooting and killing peaceful demonstrators was one of the methods the security forces used to spread fear. In 1992, the security forces killed more than 103 demonstrators, 93 of them during the celebration of Newroz in three Kurdish cities. No security force member was ever charged with any of the deaths.

In the early 1990s, hundreds of people had disappeared after they had been taken into custody by security forces. Only in 1992, more than 450 people had been reportedly killed. Among those killed were journalists, teachers, doctors, human rights activists and political leaders. The security forces usually denied to have detained the victims but sometimes they claimed that they had released the victims after "holding them briefly". According to the Human Rights Association (İHD), there have been 940 cases of enforced disappearance since the 1990s. In addition to that, more than 3,248 people who were murdered in extrajudicial killings are believed to have been buried in 253 separate burial places. On 6 January 2011, the bodies of 12 people were found in a mass grave near an old police station in Mutki, Bitlis. A few months later, three other mass graves were reportedly found in the garden of Çemişgezek police station.

In 2006, the former ambassador Rouleau stated that the continuing human rights abuses of ethnic Kurds is one of the main obstacles to Turkish membership of the EU.

Illegal abductions and enforced disappearances

During the 1990s and onward Turkish security services have detained Kurds, in some cases they were never seen again with only eyewitnesses coming forward to tell the story. In 1997, Amnesty International (AI) reported that disappearances and extrajudicial executions had emerged as new and disturbing patterns of human rights violations by the Turkish state.

The Stockholm Center for Freedom (SCF) documented eleven cases since 2016 in which people have been abducted by men identifying themselves as police officers. It appears to be mostly in the Turkish capital of Ankara as victims are forced into transit vans. Family members were unable to find out their locations from the state, indicating that they were detained secretly or by clandestine groups. In a case where one was finally located after 42 days missing, he was tortured for days, forced to sign a confession and handed over to police.

Torture

In August 1992, Human Rights Watch reported the vile practice of torture by security forces in Turkey. The victims of torture interviewed by Helsinki Watch had revealed the systematic practice of torture against detainees in police custody. Sixteen people had died in suspicious circumstances in police custody, ten of them Kurds in the Southeast.

In 2013, The Guardian reported that the rape and torture of Kurdish prisoners in Turkey are disturbingly commonplace. According to the report, published by Amnesty International in 2003, Hamdiye Aslan, a prisoner accused of supporting the Kurdish group, the PKK, had been detained in Mardin Prison, south-east Turkey, for almost three months in which she was reportedly blindfolded, anally raped with a truncheon, threatened and mocked by officers.

In February 2017, a report published by the Office of the United Nations High Commissioner for Human Rights stated the Turkish authorities had beaten and punched detainees, using sexual violence, including rape and threat of rape. In some cases, the detainees were photographed nude and threatened with public humiliation after being tortured by Turkish authorities.

Executions

On 24 February 1992, Cengiz Altun, the Batman correspondent for the weekly pro-Kurdish newspaper, Yeni Ülke, was killed. More than 33 Kurdish journalists working for different newspapers were killed between 1990 and 1995. The killings of Kurdish journalists had started after the pro-Kurdish press had started to publish the first daily newspaper by the name of "Özgür Gündem" (Free Agenda). Musa Anter, a prominent Kurdish intellectual and journalist of Özgur Gundem, was assassinated by members of Gendarmerie Intelligence Organization in 1992.

In 1992, Turkish security forces executed seventy-four people in house raids and more than a hundred people in demonstrations.

In October 2016, amateur footage emerged showing Turkish soldiers executing two female PKK members they had captured alive.

In February 2017, the Office of the United Nations High Commissioner for Human Rights published a report condemning the Turkish government for carrying out systematic executions, displacing civilians, and raping and torturing detainees in Southeastern Turkey.

In October 2019, nine people were executed, including Hevrin Khalaf, a 35-year-old Kurdish woman who was secretary-general of the Future Syria Party and who worked for interfaith unity.

Drug trafficking 
The Turkish state has similarly involved itself with drug trafficking through the conflict. During the Susurluk scandal in the mid-1990s, it was revealed the government of Tansu Çiller had employed contract killers from the Grey Wolves and Turkish mafia to assassinate between 2,500 and 5,000 members of and businessmen accused of supporting the PKK. Later on, state officials used the organizations to collect profits from the heroin trade, an industry larger than the state budget at the time. In 2021, the Turkish-backed Free Syrian Army was reported to be planting cannabis in the countryside of Afrin, an area captured from Kurdish forces during Operation Euphrates Shield.

Abuses by the Kurdish side

The Kurdistan Workers' Party has faced international condemnation for using terrorist tactics, which include kidnapping, civilian massacres, summary executions, suicide bombers, and child soldiers, and for its involvement in drug trafficking. The organization has targeted civilians, doctors, teachers, schools, hospitals, and other government institutions on a mass scale since the 1984, and is responsible for thousands of civilian deaths.  The number of total civilian deaths perpetrated by the PKK between 1989 and 1999 was determined as 1,205 by the independent Uppsala One-Sided Violence Dataset. In 1999, a report published by HRW, stated that the PKK was believed to have been responsible for more than 768 executions only between 1992 and 1995. The organization had also reportedly committed 25 massacres between 1992 and 1995, killing 360 innocent people, including 39 women and 76 children. According to Nil Satana, the author of the Kurdish Issue in June 2011 Elections, PKK attacks on civilians persisted until the organization realized that these were damaging their international prestige.

In the early 1980s, Abdullah Öcalan, the organization's leader, demanded the civilians to choose between loyalty to the government and support for the PKK, which reportedly led to a campaign against civilians, doctors, nurses, Kurdish elites, government institutions, schools and even hospitals. Additionally, hundreds of schools were burned and only between 1984 and 1987, more than 217 teachers were murdered. The PKK saw schools as "emblems of Turkish imperialism" that belonged to the "colonial assimilation system" and a justification for the killing of teachers was that they taught Turkish to Kurdish children.

In the early 1990s, the organization allegedly began to bomb civilian targets and commit massacres against innocent civilians after the government refused to negotiate. According to Jessica Stanton, an associate professor in the global policy area, the shift in PKK tactics was a direct response to government behavior. Abdullah Öcalan, the organization's leader, has been claimed to have stated publicly: 

According to Amnesty International reports in 1997, the PKK has tortured and killed Kurdish peasants and its own members that were against them in the 1980s. Dozens of Kurdish civilians have been abducted and killed because they were suspected of being collaborators or informers. According to a 1996 report by Amnesty International, "in January 1996 the [Turkish] government announced that the PKK had massacred 11 men near the remote village of Güçlükonak. Seven of the victims were members of the local village guard forces". The organization's 'suicide guerrilla teams', mainly made up of women, were responsible for 21 suicide attacks in Turkey between 1995 and 1999. The same number was 11 between the dates of 2 August 2015 and 25 August 2016.

Massacres
On 23 January 1987, PKK militias committed a massacre in Ortabağ, Şırnak Province killing 8 civilians including 4 women and 2 children.

On 20 June 1987, the organization committed a massacre in the village of Pınarcık in the Mardin Province of Turkey, killing more than 30 people, mainly women and children.

On 18 August 1987, PKK fighters massacred 14 children, including one three-day-old and one six-day-old baby, and 11 adults in Kılıçkaya village, Siirt.

On 10 June 1990, a group of guerrillas raided on Çevrimli village in Şırnak's Güçlükonak district, killing more than 27 people, most of them women and children. The event is known as Çevrimli massacre.

On 21 March 1990, PKK members blocked a road where they killed 9 engineers and a worker.

On 15 July 1991, PKK guerrillas burned nine villagers to death in their houses in the villages of Pazarcık and Çağlayancerit districts.

On 25 December 1991, PKK attacked a store in the Bakırköy district with Molotov cocktails, resulting in 11 deaths, including 7 women and 1 child.

Between 1992 and 1995 the organisation has committed 25 massacres killing 360 innocent people, including 39 women and 76 children.

On 11 June 1992, the guerrillas executed more than 13 people from a bus they stopped in Tatvan.

On 22 June 1992, a group of PKK members killed fourteen villagers, nine of them children, and wounded eight others in raids on the houses of village guards in the village of Seki in Batman Province and in Guroymak in Bitlis Province.

On 26 June 1992, 30 PKK militants raided a mosque in Diyarbakır and killed 10 worshippers.

In late June 1992, PKK militants killed five people, including a member of the village guard, in an attack on Elmasirti village in Bingöl Province.

In late September 1992, PKK militants massacred 29 civilians including many women and children in Cevizdalı village of Bitlis Province.

On 24 May 1993, a group of 150 PKK militants massacred 33 unarmed recruits and 5 civilians on the Elazığ-Bingöl highway.

On 21 October 1993, a group of PKK members killed 22 people, including 13 children in the yard of the school in Siirt. The incident is called Derince massacre.

On 25 October 1993, 4 teachers and a 2-year-old girl were murdered by PKK militants in Yolalan, Bitlis Province.

In 1998, Human Rights Watch stated in a letter to the Italian Prime Minister Massimo D'Alema that in response of Turkeys declaration of an all-out war, the PKK adapted its tactics in the following way:
 All economic, political, military, security institutions, formations and nationalist organizations—and those who serve in them—have become targets. PKK has attacked Turkish authorities outside of Kurdish areas.
 The PKK is against Turkish political parties, cultural and educational institutions, legislative and representative bodies, and "all local collaborators and agents working for the Republic of Turkey".
 Many who died were unarmed civilians, caught in the middle between the PKK and security forces, targeted for attacks by both sides.

On 21 January 1994, PKK militants massacred 21 people including 11 children in Savur, Mardin Province and claimed responsibility for the attack.

On 1 January 1995, PKK guerrillas carried out a massacre in the Hamzali neighborhood of Kulp in Diyarbakir, killing 1 village guard and more than 20 civilians, mainly women and children. The memorial has been created for the victims in the neighborhood.

In September 1995, the PKK members raided on a mine in the Seldiren village, executing nine miners and wounding two. According to the authorities, the PKK members had threatened the miners to bring food before executing them for unknown reasons. The organization later claimed the attack in Serxwebun publication by claiming the killed miners were soldiers and 'fascists'.

According to a 1996 report by Amnesty International, "in January 1996 the [Turkish] government announced that the PKK had massacred 11 men near the remote village of Güçlükonak. Seven of the victims were members of the local village guard forces".

On 30 June 1996, a suicide bombing targeting a group of 60 unarmed military personnel perpetrated by PKK occurred in Tunceli, killing 8 people and injuring 29 others.

On 25 October 1996, a suicide bombing was carried out when a PKK member detonated the explosives she had with her in front of Adana Riot Control Police Directorate, killing 5 people including a civilian and injuring 18 others.

On 29 October 1996, a suicide bombing occurred in Sivas and killed 6 people including a civilian while injuring 10 others.

On 13 March 1999, 3 PKK militants poured petroleum and threw molotov cocktails at a small sized local department store in Göztepe, Istanbul, 13 civilians, mostly women and employees of the store, were killed and 5 were injured.

On 22 May 2007, a PKK member Güven Akkuş carried out a suicide attack in Ulus, Altındağ killing 9 people and injuring more than 121 others, all civilians.

On 22 June 2010, the TAK claimed responsibility for a bombing on a bus carrying soldiers and civilians killing 5.

On 20 September 2011, 3 people died and 34 people were injured in a bomb attack in Ankara which was claimed by TAK.

On 18 October 2011, a bomb planted by PKK militants exploded in Güroymak, killing five policemen and three civilians, including a child.

On 17 February 2016, a car bomb perpetrated by TAK detonated in Ankara, killing 15 civilians and 14 soldiers while injuring 60 others.

On 13 March 2016, a member of the TAK carried out a suicide attack in Ankara, killing more than 37 civilians.

On 27 April 2016, Eser Cali, a female member of the TAK, blew herself up near an Ottoman-era mosque in the Turkish city of Bursa, wounding 13 people. Two days later, the Kurdish militant group TAK claimed the responsibility.

On 10 May 2016, 3 people were killed and 33 civilians and 12 police officers were injured in a bombing in Diyarbakır perpetrated by PKK members who targeted an armored police vehicle.

On 12 May 2016, a truck bombing took place in Dürümlü hamlet in Diyarbakir's Sur district. killing 16 people and injuring 23 others, all civilians. The People's Defence Forces (HPG), claimed that the truck was driven by members of the HPG, but that the explosives should have detonated elsewhere and the truck only detonated as villagers opened fire on the truck.

On 7 June 2016, a bombing targeting security officers perperated by TAK occurred in central Istanbul, killing 12 people including 6 security officers and 6 civilians and injuring 51 others, three of them seriously.

On 5 January 2017, PKK members detonated a car bomb outside a courthouse in Bayraklı, İzmir killing 1 civilian and 1 police officer while injuring 7 others including 3 civilians.

On 26 October 2020, a suicide bombing in İskenderun injured 2 civilians.

Kidnappings

In its early stages, some PKK members and groups systematically recruited children, men and women by kidnapping them. This forced families whose children were already a member of the organization to cooperate and thus turning them into accomplices, which increased the number of women joining the group, according to the publication, published by the Jamestown Foundation. The systematic kidnapping of men, women and even children was at its peak between the late 1980s and early 1990s, when the PKK decided to force every family to send someone to serve their armed wings after the third Congress. Many members who had been kidnapped were described as heroes in Serxwebun, the PKK's monthly magazine, after they were killed in the clashes. Some victims like Esengul Akgul, a child soldier who had been allegedly kidnapped when she was only ten years old in 1990, were described as model 'revolutionary fighters' when they died.

In early September 1992, PKK militants kidnapped five tourists, including three Americans, two Austrians and a British, near the town of Karliova, Bingöl Province, and detained them briefly.

A report published by Federation of American Scientists stated that the PKK's policy of forced recruitment by kidnapping has dramatically increased since the 1994. The organization has used the policy to offset its heavy losses since the early days of the conflict.

In 2014, a group of Kurdish families staged a sit-in in front of the town hall in the southeastern Turkish province of Diyarbakır to protest the forced recruitment of their children by PKK. After two weeks of protesting, the families started hunger strike to demand the return of their kidnapped children.

On 28 May 2012, a group of militants kidnapped 10 workers working on a road construction project in Iğdır. A month later, another group of militants blocked the road between Diyarbakır and Bingöl, and kidnapped a British tourist. All of them were released later.

Terrorism

In 1997, the State Department listed the PKK as a foreign terrorist organization for their continuous use of violence during the 1990s. On 6 November 2018, the State Department listed the PKK's three top executives, Murat Karayılan, Cemil Bayik and Duran Kalkan, in its Rewards for Justice Program which is developed by the U.S. Department of State for counter-terrorism. The program lists the names and information of the most wanted US designated terrorists in the world.

Executions
Abdullah Öcalan, the leader of the organization, who captured power by brutally suppressing dissent and purging opponents after the PKK's third Congress, consolidated absolute power through a campaign of torture and executions he started against the closest cadres in 1980.  Only in 1986, the PKK executed more than sixty of its members, including Mahsum Korkmaz, who is believed to have been murdered during the clashes on 28 March 1986. The organization also targeted the defectors and assassinated at least eight of them in the EU. Hüseyin Yıldırım, a lawyer and the PKK's former spokesman in Brussels, who broke with Öcalan and left the organization in 1987 stated:

Many governors and other politicians of AK Party in Kurdish inhabited cities were threatened with death and forced to resign by the PKK, while many politicians who refused to resign were executed and assassinated. Only between August 2016 and October 2016, 6 AK Party politicians were murdered by the organization such as Deryan Aktert. In September 2016, AK Party governors of Doğubayazıt, Özalp and Lice resigned because of the death threats while 3 other AK Party politicians in Ergani resigned in the first week of October 2016.

In March 1984, 4 people from the same family were executed in Çukurca. Serxwebûn accused them of being informers.

On 15 May 1987, İsa Karaaslan, a father of 3 children and a teacher was accused of being a spy for the Turkish Intelligence and was executed.

On 21 August 1987, in Yolçatı village of Lice, teacher Asim Özmen and imam Mehmet Bayram were taken from their houses and executed. Serxwebûn accused both of them of being spies.

On 17 July 1987, 5 people were executed by PKK in Şırnak Province. Serxwebûn, a publication of the PKK announced the executions and stated that executed people were all "traitors".

On 31 July 1987, Serxwebûn announced that PKK executed Hıdır Kılıçaslan in Kuyubaşı hamlet of Akören village in Hozat and accused him of being an "ungrained traitor".

Between 1992 and 1995, PKK carried out 768 extrajudicial executions, mostly of civil servants and teachers, political opponents, off-duty police officers and soldiers, and those deemed by the PKK to be "state supporters."

On 12 February 2006, PKK's former representative of Europe, Kani Yılmaz was assassinated by PKK via a bomb that was put into his car. Yılmaz was burned to death in the car with a former PKK militant Sabri Tori.

On 27 September 2017, the organization kidnapped and executed Mahmut Bazancir who was mistakenly accused of being an informer.

On 25 November 2017, PKK executed 2 of its own members in Duhok Governorate of Iraq.

On 25 July 2018, Mevlüt Bengi, a father of 6 children, was executed and tied to an electricity tower by guerrillas, who reportedly justified the execution by accusing him of being a collaborator with the AK Party, which he had served as an election observer at the ballot boxes in his district during the 24 June elections. The HPG released a statement that it has killed Mevlüt Bengi, but for having caused serious harm to the Kurdish movement, and not for being a member of a certain party.

Child soldiers

According to the TEPAV think-tank which did research on the identities of 1,362 PKK fighters who lost their lives between 2001 and 2011, 42% of the recruits were under 18, with over a quarter of these being under 15 years of age at the time of recruiting. The organization is still actively recruiting child soldiers and it has been accused of abducting more than 2,000 children by Turkish Security Forces. The latest independent reports by the Human Rights Watch (HRW), the United Nations (UN) and the Amnesty International have confirmed the recruitment and use of child soldiers by the organization and its armed wings since the 1990s. The organization is also believed to have used the children in the drug trade.

In 2008, a report published by Child Soldiers International stated that the PKK was believed in 1998 to have had 3,000 child soldiers in its forces based in Iraq and operating in Southeast Turkey.

The armed wing of the PKK, signed in October 2008 a Deed of Commitment of the Geneva Call, which prohibits the employment of youth below 18 years old to be recruited. Following repeated reports in the international media about child soldiers in PKK ranks, representatives of Geneva Call visited PKK camps in order to monitor the application of the Deed of Commitment. They visited camps in which youths of the age between sixteen and eighteen would be accepted on a voluntary basis and while being there would stay away from armed conflict and be educated.

Drug trafficking

In 2011, the report published by the  United Nations Office on Drugs and Crime (UNODC) stated that the instability in Iraq had helped the PKK to develop and use Iraq as a transhipment point for heroin. The PKK was reported to collect taxes per kilogram of heroin trafficked to Turkey from the borders of Islamic Republic of Iran and Iraq, with potential profits reaching US$200 million annually. Another report published by European Police Office (EUROPOL) in the same year stated the organization is actively involved in money laundering, illicit drugs and human trafficking, as well as illegal immigration inside and outside the EU for funding and running its activities.

In 2012, the U.S. Department of the Treasury's Office of Foreign Assets Control (OFAC) announced the designation of Zeyneddin Geleri, Cerkez Akbulut (a.k.a. Cernit Murat), and Omer Boztepe as three Moldovan-based specially designated narcotics traffickers for drug trafficking on behalf of the PKK in Europe. According to the OFAC, Zeyneddin Geleri was identified as a high-ranking member of the PKK while two others were reportedly just PKK activists. The OFAC stated that the drug trafficking is one of the PKK's criminal activities it uses to obtain weapons and materials to fight the Turkish government.

Notes

References

Conflicts in 1978
Iraqi Kurdistan
History of the Kurdistan Workers' Party
 
1978
Turkish Kurdistan
Wars involving the Peshmerga
Wars involving Turkey
20th-century conflicts
21st-century conflicts
20th century in Turkey
21st century in Turkey
1970s conflicts
1980s conflicts
1990s conflicts
2000s conflicts
2010s conflicts
2020s conflicts